Kim Byung-Chan also written as Kim Byeong-Chan (김 병찬, 27 December 1970 – 25 June 2015) was a South Korean male weightlifter, who competed in the middleweight and middle heavyweight class, representing South Korea at international competitions. He won the bronze medal at the 1991 World Weightlifting Championships in the 90 kg category. He participated at the 1988 Summer Olympics and at the 1992 Summer Olympics in the 90 kg event. He won the gold medal at the 1990 Asian Games in the Middle-Heavyweight class.

References

External links
 

1970 births
2015 deaths
South Korean male weightlifters
World Weightlifting Championships medalists
Place of birth missing
Olympic weightlifters of South Korea
Weightlifters at the 1992 Summer Olympics
Weightlifters at the 1990 Asian Games
Asian Games medalists in weightlifting
Asian Games gold medalists for South Korea
Weightlifters at the 1988 Summer Olympics
Medalists at the 1990 Asian Games
20th-century South Korean people
21st-century South Korean people
Deaths from gastrointestinal hemorrhage